The 2022 Osun State gubernatorial election took place on 16 July 2022, to elect the governor of Osun State. Incumbent All Progressives Congress Governor Gboyega Oyetola was eligible for re-election but lost by a 3.5% margin to former Senator Ademola Adeleke—the nominee of the Peoples Democratic Party. Adeleke and his running mate, Kola Adewusi, were inaugurated on 27 November. However, the Election Petition Tribunal overturned the result on 27 January 2023, awarding the win to Oyetola; Adeleke immediately appealed the ruling and remains in office pending the results of further litigation.

The primaries, scheduled for between 16 February and 12 March, resulted in Oyetola winning the APC nomination for a second time, albeit amid outcry from his primary challengers. For the main opposition PDP, longtime internal disputes led to two parallel primaries being held as a faction nominated former senatorial candidate Dotun Babayemi while the faction recognized by the national PDP nominated former Senator for Osun West Ademola Adeleke, the party's 2018 nominee. As the Independent National Electoral Commission only observed the primary that nominated Adeleke, he was recognized as the legitimate PDP nominee.

The general election was noted by solid logistical organisation and mainly peaceful voting but was marred by reports of vote buying. By the early morning of 17 July, collation completed and the Independent National Electoral Commission declared Adeleke as the winner. In total, Adeleke won over 400,000 votes and 50% of the vote as runner-up Oyetola received around 375,000 votes and over 46% of the vote. Electoral analysis focused on the effect of the divisions within the state APC along with the election's national impact as the final election before the presidential election in 2023. Civil society and election observer groups concentrated on the vote-buying reports but commended the highly successful election administration by INEC which resulted in smooth voting, direct online transmission of results, and an early winner declaration. However, Oyetola rejected the results and filed a challenge at the electoral tribunal. In a separate court case, Oyetola's nomination was voided after a court ruled that the APC gubernatorial primary was illegally conducted; however, Oyetola won the appeal.

Electoral system
The governor of Osun State is elected using a modified two-round system. To be elected in the first round, a candidate must receive the plurality of the vote and over 25% of the vote in at least two-thirds of state local government areas. If no candidate passes this threshold, a second round will be held between the top candidate and the next candidate to have received a plurality of votes in the highest number of local government areas.

Background
Osun State is a small, Yoruba-majority southwestern state with vast natural areas and rich cultural heritage but facing an underdeveloped agricultural sector and high debt.

Politically, Oyetola's close 2018 victory was a forerunner of the state's competitiveness in the 2019 elections with presidential incumbent Muhammadu Buhari barely winning the state back and all three Senate races being fairly close. Of the Senate elections, two seats went to the APC and one went to the PDP while the House of Representatives elections went 6 APC and 3 PDP. Contrastly, the APC won a large majority in the State House of Assembly.

At the beginning of Oyetola's term, his promises included completing in-progress projects, full payment of civil servant salaries, and further developing his predecessor's welfare programs. In terms of his performance, Oyetola was commended for mining development but was criticized for declaring numerous public holidays and failing to pay pensions. Oyetola also came under pressure when the Pandora Papers revealed that he had bought a London mansion from an international fugitive wanted for money laundering using a British Virgin Islands-based offshore company as Nigerian authorities were attempting to freeze the fugitive's assets.

Primary elections
The primaries, along with any potential challenges to primary results, were scheduled for between February 16 and March 12. According to some candidates and community leaders, an informal zoning gentlemen's agreement should have set the Osun West Senatorial District to have the next governor as since the 1999 return of democracy, all Osun governors have come from either the Osun East or Osun Central Senatorial Districts. While the PDP ended up nominating Adelake, a westerner, Oyetola was renominated by the APC despite his Central origins.

All Progressives Congress 
Although there were rumors of a rift between Governor Oyetola and former Governor Rauf Aregbesola that could lead to Oyetola failing to be renominated, Osun APC Chairman Gboyega Famodun claimed that Oyetola was widely accepted throughout the state and local APC chapters and thus would have the support of the state party. However, the Osun State APC later factionalized between the Oyetola-aligned IleriOluwa faction (chaired by Famodun) and the Aregbesola-aligned The Osun Progressives faction (chaired by Rasaq Salinsile). Despite outside attempts at reconciliation, the party crisis deepened by January 2022 and the threat of two parallel primaries loomed as Oyetola registered to run in the IleriOluwa APC while challengers registered to run in the TOP APC. Eventually, the IleriOluwa faction was recognized by the national APC and the primary continued within it as Aregbesola endorsed challenger Moshood Adeoti while Oyetola began his campaign for a second term.

In January 2022, the APC rescheduled its primary for February 19 with the expression of interest form costing ₦2.5 million and the nomination form costing ₦20 million; a 50% discount would be provided to women candidates and candidates with disabilities. The party also rescheduled its candidate screening and screening appeal process for February 10 and 15, respectively. Different dates had been announced in November but the dates were changed after national revision.

In the days before the election, the Oyetola-Aregbesola feud escalated after Aregbesola formally endorsed Adeoti on February 14. Aregbesola then claimed that his convoy was attacked later that day in an assassination attempt while the police and Oyetola administration claimed that Aregbesola's guards shot into the air without any provocation. The next day, Aregbesola allies claimed that they had uncovered a new plot to kill Aregbesola by "state government-sponsored political thugs," thus indirectly accusing Oyetola of organizing the assassination plots. These incidents lead to fears that the primary could be marred by violence despite the increased security presence during the exercise. Thankfully, the practice was mainly peaceful, albeit with one person being shot dead over a non-election related dispute according to police. In the early morning of February 20, head of the primary committee and Kwara State Governor AbdulRahman AbdulRazaq declared Oyetola as the APC nominee after announced results showed him defeating Adeoti and former House Deputy Speaker Yusuf Sulaimon Lasun by over 200,000 votes with 60% turnout. Before the results were even announced, Adeoti and his allies rejected the primary wholeheartedly with his supporters claiming that their names were purposefully left off registers, others observing that INEC officials were absent from units, and Aregbesola calling the primary a "sham of an election." For their part, Oyetola supporters backed the exercise's fairness and Oyetola himself called for party unity the day after the primary. Prior to taking outside legal action, Adeoti appealed to the APC primary election appeal committee which denied his appeal; accordingly, Adeoti then asked a Federal High Court in Abuja to declare him winner. The case was not resolved until 14 July when Justice Inyang Eden Ekwo dismissed the lawsuit. However, a different case brought by the PDP contested that the primary was invalid due to illegitimate APC national leadership as then-APC Chair Mai Mala Buni was an incumbent governor; on 1 October 2022, a Federal High Court ruled in favor of the PDP, nullifying the APC gubernatorial primary and declaring Oyetola's nomination void. The APC announced that the party would appeal the ruling and on 3 December, a Court of Appeal judgment overturned the lower court's decision. On 2 February 2023, the Supreme Court upheld the Court of Appeal judgment by dismissing the PDP case.

Nominated 
 Gboyega Oyetola: Governor, former Chief of Staff to the Governor, and relative of former Lagos State Governor Bola Tinubu
 Running mate—Benedict Gboyega Alabi: Deputy Governor

Defeated in primary 
 Moshood Adeoti: former Secretary to the State Government
 Yusuf Sulaimon Lasun: former House of Representatives member for Irepodun/Olurunda/Osogbo/Orolu, former Deputy Speaker of the House of Representatives, and 2018 APC gubernatorial candidate (defected after to the primary to successfully obtain the LP gubernatorial nomination)

Declined 
 Najeem Salaam: former Speaker of the Osun State House of Assembly

Results

By local government area

People's Democratic Party 
By 2021, Ademola Adeleke, the 2018 PDP nominee, had already received the support of the national PDP with party officials claiming he has effectively been given the nomination according to PDP Deputy National Publicity Secretary Duran Odeyemi. However, the state PDP claimed that while "the majority of our party stakeholders" were supporting Adeleke, all contenders were allowed to run in the primary. This assessment became contested as the state party later factionalized between the Adeleke-supporting faction (chaired by Sunday Bisi) and the faction aligned with the other five candidates (chaired by Wale Ojo). Another internal battle was sparked in January 2022 when a dispute between Ademola and Dele Adeleke—both members of the powerful Adeleke political family of Ede—escalated and tied in popular musician Davido, cousin of Dele and nephew of Ademola, who has supported Ademola since 2018 and attacked Dele on social media.

In November 2021, the PDP announced that its primary will be held on March 7, 2022 with the sale of the expression of interest and nomination forms being held between November 22 and December 10. On January 8, the PDP rescheduled its candidate screening from January 11 to January 12 with the screening appeal process remaining scheduled for January 26; all six candidates were approved by the committee. The primary date was later pushed back to March 8.

In the weeks ahead of the primaries, contentious ward congresses to elect delegates for the primary left two people dead and led to fear of continued violence between the Bisi and Ojo factions during the primary itself. The primary was shaping to primarily be a rematch of the 2018 primary between Ademola Adeleke and Akin Ogunbiyi until Ogunbiyi withdrew on 7 March citing alleged bias from the national party in favour of A. Adeleke; on the same day Sanya Omirin, Dele Adeleke, and Fatai Akinade Akinbade also dropped out leaving just Dotun Babayemi and A. Adeleke in the race. On the morning of the primary, two parallel primaries held with the Ojo-led faction holding a primary at the Women and Children Development Initiative Foundation (WOCDIF) Centre while the Bisi-led faction (backed by the national PDP) held its primary at the Osogbo City Stadium. After both primaries were peacefully held, the WOCDIF Centre primary ended in Babayemi winning by a wide margin while the Stadium primary resulted in a large win for Ademola Adeleke. The national party-appointed returning officer, Bayelsa Deputy Governor Lawrence Ewhrudjakpo, presided over the Stadium primary and dismissed the WOCDIF Centre primary as "invalid" while former Governor Olagunsoye Oyinlola backed the WOCDIF Centre primary. The PDP national headquarters gave Adeleke the certificate of return on March 10 but Babayemi stated that the decision was "not the end of journey." As the Independent National Electoral Commission only observed the primary that nominated Adeleke, he was listed as the legitimate PDP nominee in April before in May, a Federal High Court dismissed Babayemi's challenge to be declared nominee. In July, after the general election, Babayemi's appeal was also rejected as the Court of Appeal in Akure upheld the High Court ruling. He again appealed, but the Supreme Court upheld the rulings of the lower courts and sided with Adeleke in late September 2022.

Nominated 
 Ademola Adeleke: former Senator for Osun West, 2018 PDP gubernatorial nominee, member of the Adeleke family, and uncle of opponent Dele Adeleke
 Running mate—Kola Adewusi

Defeated in primary 
 Dotun Babayemi: 2019 ADP Osun West senatorial nominee and son of former Olufi of Gbongan Solomon Oyewole Babayemi

Withdrew 
 Dele Adeleke: accountant, member of the Adeleke family, and nephew of opponent Ademola Adeleke
 Fatai Akinade Akinbade: 2018 ADC gubernatorial nominee, former Secretary to the State Government, and former commissioner
 Akin Ogunbiyi: Chairman of Mutual Benefits Assurance and 2018 PDP gubernatorial candidate (defected after the primary to successfully obtain the Accord gubernatorial nomination)
 Sanya Omirin: former commissioner and former Atakunmosa East LG Chairman

Declined 
 Ayoade Adewopo: 2018 PDP gubernatorial candidate
 Oluwole Oke: House of Representatives member for Oriade/Obokun
 Akinlabi Olasunkanmi: former Minister of Youth Development and 2018 PDP gubernatorial candidate

Results

Minor parties

Nominees 

 Akin Ogunbiyi (Accord)
Running mate: Kunle Jimoh
 Peter Segun Awojide (African Action Congress)
Running mate: Gideon Fakiyesi
 Kehinde Munirudeen Atanda (Action Democratic Party)
Running mate: Claret Agbaje
 Awoyemi Oluwatayo Lukuman (Allied Peoples Movement)
Running mate: Akinloye Adesola
 Adebayo Adeolu Elisha (Action Peoples Party)
Running mate: Hezekiah Akinpelu
 Adeleke Adedapo (Boot Party)
Running mate: Lateef Adenike
 Yusuf Sulaimon Lasun (Labour Party)
Running mate: Adeola Atanda
 Rasaq Oyelami Saliu (New Nigeria Peoples Party)
Running mate: Olatunbosun Olusolape
 Samuel Adetona Abede (National Rescue Movement)
Running mate: Amoo Omolara
 Busuyi Ayowole (People's Redemption Party)
Running mate: Olowu Aiyedun
 Akinrinola Oyegoke Omigbodun (Social Democratic Party)
Running mate: Oni Adesoye
 Ademola Bayonle Adeseye (Young Progressives Party)
Running mate: Stella Adeagbo
 John Olufemi Adesuyi (Zenith Labour Party)
Running mate: Grace Kemi Fakolade

Campaign
After the primaries confirmed that the general election would be a rematch of 2018 between Oyetola (APC) and Adeleke (PDP), analysts contended that the election would be shaped by what each camp had done since 2018 as the power struggle between the two continued. For both, the early parts of the general election campaign were dominated by attempts to address controversies around their respective primaries as the contentious primaries were identified as a key potential problem for their campaign. However, several of both nominees' intraparty opponents remained disgruntled leading one of Oyetola's primary challengers (Yusuf Sulaimon Lasun) to leave the APC entirely to run under the LP while one of Adeleke's primary opponents (Akin Ogunbiyi) defected to become Accord flagbearer. On the other hand, Adeleke and Babayemi settled their dispute in May as the national APC attempted to reconcile Oyetola and Aregbesola around the same time.

As campaigning escalated in May and June, the nominees' unveiled their policy agendas and brought in out-of-state politicians to hold rallies. However, for the PDP, the internal crisis surrounding the party's presidential primary led aggrieved politicians to avoid the Osun campaign trail. Analysts noted the similarities to the 2018 race during the campaign while continuing to focus on both state parties' attempts to reconcile their nominees with intraparty opposition. Policy also took centre stage in the fortnight before the election as debates were held; the first debate on 30 June was held by BBC Yoruba and had Adeleke attack Oyetola for bad roads and hospitals while Oyetola touted his administration's banking and security policies. In the second debate, conducted by Arise News on 6 July, Oyetola vowed to create jobs and voiced his support for state police but the debate was not attended by Adeleke. The final debate, jointly held by Channels TV and the Nigeria Civil Society Situation Room, was attended by both major contenders as Adeleke attacked Oyetola on security while Oyetola attempted to defend his record. The days right before the election were overshadowed by an armed attack on Lasun's home on 11 July; to combat fears of further electoral violence, 13 candidates signed a peace accord on 13 July at the behest of the National Peace Committee. Analysis directly before the election confirmed the competitiveness of the race while noting the election's numerous factors and its national implications as the final election before the next year's presidential election.

Election debates

Conduct

Electoral timetable
The Independent National Electoral Commission released the timetable, setting out key dates and deadlines for the election.

 15 February 2022 – Publication of Notice of Election
 16 February 2022 – First day for the conduct of party primaries
 12 March 2022 – Final day for the conduct of party primaries, including the resolution of disputes arising from them
 14 March 2022 – First day for submission of nomination forms to INEC via the online portal
 18 March 2022 – Final day for submission of nomination forms to INEC via the online portal
 17 April 2022 – Commencement of the official campaign period
 14 July 2022 – Final day of the official campaign period
 16 July 2022 – Election Day

Pre-election
As the election neared, INEC and other authorities started announcing their preparations with the election commission announcing that it would deploy both full-time and ad-hoc staffers to the state's 3,753 polling units on election day along with BVAS machines while noting that vote buying was a major concern in the wake of the Ekiti State gubernatorial election. For the Nigeria Police Force, a statement on 10 July noted that police would deploy Deputy Inspector-General Johnson Babatunde Kokumo to be coordinator of election security efforts that would include thousands of conventional police officers and soldiers along with special forces, five armored personnel carriers, three helicopters, and drones.

Election Day
On election day, voting was mainly peaceful and logistically well-organized but reports of vote buying from party agents marred the exercise. On the other hand, INEC was commended for successful election administration as the vast majority of polling units had early-arriving officials, security operatives, and well-functioning equipment according to preliminary reports from election observers CDD West Africa, Nigeria Civil Society Situation Room, and YIAGA Africa.

General election

Results

By senatorial district

The results of the election by senatorial district.

By federal constituency

The results of the election by federal constituency.

By local government area
The results of the election by local government area.

Notes

Response

Candidates and parties
Before the results were even formally announced, videos of Adeleke and his supporters celebrating emerged after the PDP's own count reportedly confirmed his victory. After he was declared winner, Adeleke dedicated his victory to his late brother—Isiaka Adeleke—and the people of Osun State. For Oyetola's part, he did not initially respond to the results as a 17 July morning press release from his office simply said he had "taken cognisance of the results" and planned to study them in addition to consulting "with critical stakeholders of the party." Former Governor and serving minister Rauf Aregbesola—Oyetola's intraparty rival who boycotted the election and allegedly supported Adeleke—celebrated the results in social media posts titled Osun Le Tente but deleted the posts soon afterwards with an aide saying the messages were "unauthorised."

On the national level, President Muhammadu Buhari congratulated Adeleke on the morning of 17 July and labeled the election as a positive step "towards strengthening the integrity of the electoral process in Nigeria" while APC National Chairman Abdullahi Adamu later stated the party's surprise at the results. Similarly to Buhari, PDP presidential nominee Atiku Abubakar and LP presidential nominee Peter Obi also congratulated Adeleke on 17 July. However, APC presidential nominee Bola Tinubu is yet to release a statement on the result, reportedly deferring to Oyetola for the next move.

It was not until 4 August that Oyetola or the state APC revealed their next plans when Osun APC Chairman Gboyega Famodun finally announced that the party planned to challenge the election results at the elections petitions tribunal.

Civil society
From civil society, reports spoke positively about the election turnout and INEC's administration but again noted the prevalence of vote buying. The nonprofit YIAGA Africa, which monitored the election and ran a parallel vote tabulation, stated that PVT had verified the accuracy of INEC's released results as the released totals for the two major candidates fell well within the ranges estimated by PVT. YIAGA stated that INEC's turnout and rejected ballot numbers were in estimated ranges as well. However, YIAGA and other groups like the Nigeria Civil Society Situation Room lamented the vote buying reports and called on authorities to come up with countermeasures.

Analysis
In the days after the election, political analysts noted several post-election takeaways with the political focus on the impact the results could have on the presidential race, especially since Oyetola is the relative and close ally of Bola Tinubu—the APC presidential nominee. Pundits also noted numerous potential reasons for the result, namely: the divide within the state APC, anger at the APC administration—both on the state and national levels, the political clout of the Adeleke family, and the successful Adeleke campaign which often featured his nephew Davido. Observers also noted anger at Oyetola over the alleged diversion of COVID-19 palliatives meant for the public and his administration's failure to pay owed civil servant salaries; in addition, post-election analysis examined specific cases of APC infighting in several LGAs that Adeleke eventually won, the extensive campaigning of PDP figures like former Senate President Bukola Saraki and Edo State Governor Godwin Obaseki, and the purported support that Aregbesola and LP nominee Lasun gave to Adeleke.

Aftermath

Litigation 
The tribunal opened its registry for complaints before election day with David Umar Dike, the Tribunal Secretary, noting that complainants had 21 days to file challenges. On 4 August, Osun APC Chairman Gboyega Famodun announced Oyetola's intent to challenge the results at the Election Petition Tribunal, stating that "we have a strong case and we believe we will win at the court." In response, Osun PDP Caretaker Committee Chairman Akindele Adekunle condemned the APC's contest to the election results, describing the move "as anti-people and a challenge of God's will" while expressing a lack of concern about the result of the challenge "as the election that produced the winner was adjudged to be of global democratic compliance." Later that month, Oyetola formally filed his petition and the Tribunal began hearing the challenge application on 22 August. As the case continued and the formal tribunal sitting date was set for 26 September, Oyetola's team proposed a relocation of the tribunal from Osogbo to Abuja but were rebuffed by an appeal court. After the initial hearings in September, the tribunal continued meeting until January to hear the Oyetola case which was based on overvoting in certain polling units and claims that Adeleke had falsified certificates. The date for the tribunal's judgment is set for 27 January. On the date, the tribunal ruled against Adeleke in a judgement that declared Oyetola the rightfully elected governor based on the reports of overvoting. The judgment sparked protests and prompted an immediate appeal from now-Governor Adeleke, who remains in office pending the results of further litigation.

Transition and inauguration 
Adeleke and Adewusi received the certificates of return on 20 July at a brief ceremony at the Osun State INEC office in Osogbo. About a week later, Adeleke formed a 37-member transition committee chaired by former House of Representatives member Muyiwa Oladimeji. While inaugurating the committee, Adeleke tasked its members with forming an agenda for his first hundred days and his first year in office. About a week later, the House of Assembly began working on the Transition Bill 2022 to organize a clean transition. For Oyetola administration's part, despite the electoral challenge, moves were made to consolidate APC power in the state by scheduling local government elections for 15 October—about a month before the inauguration; the PDP protested the election as "illegal" and attempt to defraud the state while the Osun Independent Electoral Commission pointed out that the previous local government elections were four years beforehand. Although the elections were held, they were declared illegal by courts after the fact.

The inauguration was held on 27 November at the Oshogbo Stadium in Osogbo. Attendees included the Ooni of Ife, Davido, and several PDP governors along with the party's presidential nominee Atiku Abubakar; Oyetola did not attend the ceremony, instead publishing a farewell statement that noted his ongoing challenge to the election results. Adeleke and Adewusi were sworn in by the Chief Judge of the Osun State High Court—Oyebola Adepele-Ojo; Adeleke then gave an inaugural address in which he announced a freeze order on all state government accounts, vowed to investigate corruption from the Oyetola administration, ordered the reversion of the state name back to "Osun State" from "State of Osun," and reversed several Oyetola appointments. The next day, a flurry of executive orders codified these inauguration vows along with mandating the review of all Oyetola's traditional ruler enthronements after the election, ordering the dethronement of three traditional rulers, and reversing all other Oyetola appointments made after the election along with commencing reviews and a staff sudit.

Notes

See also 
 2022 Nigerian elections
 2022 Nigerian gubernatorial elections

References 

Osun State gubernatorial election
2022
Osun